Bathycrinicola macrapex is a species of sea snail, a marine gastropod mollusc in the family Eulimidae.

Distribution
This marine species occurs in the Gulf of Gascony.

References

External links
 To World Register of Marine Species

Eulimidae
Gastropods described in 1986